Marcell Matolcsi (born 1 February 1991, in Budapest) is a professional Hungarian footballer who currently plays for Vasas SC.

Club statistics

Updated to games played as of 20 May 2012.

External links
 HLSZ 
 MLSZ 

1991 births
Living people
Footballers from Budapest
Hungarian footballers
Association football defenders
Vasas SC players